Nicholas Rafael Llanos Lohinski (born 10 February 1996) is a Croatian footballer who plays as a midfielder for Croatian club Solin.

Career

Club career

As a youth player, Llanos joined the youth academy of Croatian top flight side Hajduk after trialing for the youth academy of Vitesse in the Netherlands and receiving interest from the youth academies of Spanish La Liga club Barcelona, Inter in the Italian Serie A, and English Premier League team Chelsea. After that, he signed a 3 year deal with América de Cali from Colombia but that deal was broken by team’s owner Tulio Gómez. In 2017, he signed for Croatian third division outfit RNK SPLIT 

In 2018, Llanos signed for Osijek in the Croatian top flight. Before the second half of 2018–19, he was sent on loan to Croatian second division side Zadar. In 2021, he signed for Široki Brijeg in Bosnia and Herzegovina. On 25 July 2021, Llanos debuted for Široki Brijeg during a 1-1 draw with Rudar (Prijedor). On 17 October 2021, he scored his first goal for Široki Brijeg during a 2-1 win over Rudar Prijedor.

International career

Llanos is eligible to represent Colombia internationally through his father.

References

External links
 

1996 births
Living people
Footballers from Rijeka
Croatian people of Colombian descent
Association football midfielders
Croatian footballers
HNK Hajduk Split II players
RNK Split players
NK Osijek players
NK Dugopolje players
NK Zadar players
NK Croatia Zmijavci players
NK Solin players
NK Široki Brijeg players
Second Football League (Croatia) players
First Football League (Croatia) players
Premier League of Bosnia and Herzegovina players
Croatian expatriate footballers
Expatriate footballers in Bosnia and Herzegovina
Croatian expatriate sportspeople in Bosnia and Herzegovina